V533 Carinae (V533 Car, y Car, y Carinae) is a white A-type supergiant variable star with a mean apparent magnitude of +4.59 in the constellation Carina.  It is over 10,000 light years from Earth.

Location

V533 Carinae is found near the Carina Nebula on the edge of the constellation Carina towards Crux.  It is a member of Collinder 240, a sparse open cluster sometimes considered to be a portion of the richer nearby cluster NGC 3572.  Together with the small clusters Hogg 10 and 11, they are all part of the Carina OB2 stellar association.

V533 Carinae is the brightest star in the region.  The other bright stars in NGC 3572 are hot young stars such as HD 97166 and all the clusters in the region are only a few million years old.

V533 Carinae is classified as a double star with the companion being a magnitude 11.5 star 21.7 arc-seconds away.

Variability

V533 Carinae was one of many small amplitude variable stars detected from an analysis of Hipparcos photometry.  It was granted its variable star designation in 1999 as a batch of 2,675 new variables.  It is classified as an Alpha Cygni type variable and its brightness varies from magnitude +4.69 to +4.75 as measured on the Hipparcos photometric scale.  A period of 1.58499 days and an average visual amplitude of 0.0146 magnitudes are quoted although the variations are not strictly regular.

Properties

V533 Carinae is a bright supergiant with a luminosity around 100,000 times that of the sun. Its equatorial rotation is more than 15 times faster than the sun's.

Prior to 1971, it was always classified with an early or mid F-type spectral type, but since then has always been given a mid or late A class.

References

External links
 Coolinder 240 region

Alpha Cygni variables
Carinae, y
Carina (constellation)
A-type supergiants
Carinae, V533
097534
4352
054751
Durchmusterung objects
Emission-line stars